McCafferty is a surname of Irish/Scottish origin. It is derived from the Gaelic Mac Eachmharcaigh, meaning "son of Eachmharcach". Notable people with the surname include:

Archie McCafferty, Scottish-born Australian serial killer
Bill McCafferty (1882–1929), Scottish footballer
Christine McCafferty (born 1945), English politician
Dan McCafferty (1946–2022), Scottish singer
Don McCafferty (1921–1974), American footballer and coach
Ian McCafferty (born 1944), Scottish athlete
Ian McCafferty (born 1956), British economist
Jack McCafferty (1914–1999), Australian businessman
Jane McCafferty, American writer
John McCafferty, British scientist
John Edgar McCafferty (1920-1980), American Catholic bishop
Megan McCafferty (born 1973), American writer
Neil McCafferty (born 1984), Northern Irish footballer
Nell McCafferty (born 1944), Irish journalist and playwright
Owen McCafferty (born 1961), Northern Irish playwright
Tommy McCafferty, Irish kickboxer

Surnames of Irish origin
Surnames of Scottish origin